Burwell may refer to:

People
 Burwell (name)

Places
 Burwell, Cambridgeshire
 Burwell, Lincolnshire
 Burwell, Nebraska
 Burwell Creek, a stream in Georgia
 The Burwell, an NRHP-listed high-rise in Knoxville, Tennessee

Ships
 USS Laub (DD-263), a destroyer renamed HMS Burwell when she was transferred to the Royal Navy in World War II

Government
 Sylvia Mathews Burwell (born 1965), United States Secretary of Health and Human Services, who due to that role, has been named as the defendant in several related lawsuits:
 Burwell v. Hobby Lobby
 King v. Burwell
 Zubik v. Burwell